Michael Dezertzov (born 1 April 1941), known as Michael Dezer, is an Israeli-American real estate developer, car collector, and billionaire. He is the founder of Dezer Properties and is known for his investments in New York and Florida real estate in association with Donald Trump.

Biography
Dezer was born in a working-class family in Tel Aviv, Israel, the son of a bus driver. He served in the Israeli Air Force.

In 1962, he immigrated from Israel to the U.S. where he went to night school and worked in advertising before starting a typesetting business. 

In 1970, he founded Dezer Properties and started investing in real estate in New York City,  focusing on the Chelsea neighborhood, which was then transitioning into an arts community from a manufacturing center. He focused on converting factory buildings into luxury office cooperatives. By 1994, he owned 15 buildings in the area.

Starting in 1985, he purchased as much ocean-front land in Sunny Isles Beach as he could, much of which was old motels. In partnership with Donald Trump, he developed properties there including the $900 million Trump Towers, the $600 million Trump Grande Ocean Resort and Residences, and the $166 million Trump International Hotel and Tower.

Dezer is also the landlord of the luxury auto retailer Manhattan Motorcars.

Personal life

Family
Dezer is Jewish, of Russian descent. He is married to fellow Israeli Neomi (née Kerekes) and has three children: daughters Leslie Dezer Salmon (born 1970) and Estee Dezer Gurwitz (born 1978); and son Gil Dezer (born 1975). All his children participate in the family business. Gil Dezer, also a car collector, developed the 60-story Porsche Design Tower in Sunny Isles Beach.

Car collection
Dezer collects cars and displays over 1,000 cars from his collection in the Miami Auto Museum in North Miami, Florida. The collection has diverse types of cars including European and American classic cars, microcars, movie cars, supercars, and military vehicles. He also has motorcycles, scooters, bicycles and the largest collection of Vespas displayed at the museum. He launched 2 outposts of his main Miami Auto Museum. In 2014, he opened the Hollywood Cars Museum in Las Vegas by partnering with classic and exotic car dealer Hot Rod City to display more than 100 cars from movies, TV shows and videos. In 2016, he spent $3.6 million on a space in Xtreme Action Park in Fort Lauderdale to open the second outpost of his main museum to display about 200 cars.

Political contributions
Ahead of the 2016 United States elections, Dezer donated $100,000 to Trump's Make America Great Again PAC and $200,000 to the Trump Victory Committee. Ahead of the 2020 United States elections, he donated $100,000 to the Trump Victory Committee.

References

1941 births
American car collectors
American people of Israeli descent
American people of Russian-Jewish descent
American real estate businesspeople
Businesspeople from New York City
Israeli businesspeople
Israeli Jews
Israeli people of Russian-Jewish descent
Living people
New York (state) Republicans